The Most Distinguished Order of the Star and Key of the Indian Ocean is the highest distinct order of merit in the honours system of Mauritius established under the National Awards Act 1993. It was founded in 1992 to decorate people who have made a contribution to social progress in the nations of the Indian Ocean. It may be awarded to non-Mauritian citizens.

Chancellor
The chancellor of the order is the President of the Republic of Mauritius. Each year on Independence day (12 March) the president of the republic appoints new members on the recommendation of the prime minister.

Labour Day has a special significance to the order as it relates to the hardship of people working for their country. On Labour Day 2007 the Malagasy President Marc Ramalomanana was appointed to the rank of Grand Commander, the highest rank of the order.

Privileges
Recipients of the rank of Grand Officer or above are automatically entitled to prefix The Hon, Hons or The Honourable to their name. Commanders and Officers may request permission from the president to use this prefix. Recipients of the order who are not Mauritian citizens may not use the prefix or post-nominals unless granted permission by the president.

Composition 

The Order comprises five classes, in descending order of seniority:
 Grand Commander of the Order of the Star and Key of the Indian Ocean (GCSK)
 Grand Officer of the Order of the Star and Key of the Indian Ocean (GOSK)
 Commander of the Order of the Star and Key of the Indian Ocean (CSK)
 Officer of the Order of the Star and Key of the Indian Ocean (OSK)
 Member of the Order of the Star and Key of the Indian Ocean (MSK)

Composition of the medal

Recipients

Grand Commanders of the Order of the Star and Key of the Indian Ocean (GCSK)

Grand Officers of the Order of the Star and Key of the Indian Ocean (GOSK)

References

Orders, decorations, and medals of Mauritius